Marktleugast is a municipality in the district of Kulmbach in Bavaria in Germany.

Geography 
Marktleugast is located on the southeastern edge of the Frankenwald Nature Park.

City arrangement

Marktleugast is arranged in the following boroughs:

 Baiersbach
 Filshof
 Großrehmühle
 Hanauerhof
 Hermes
 Hinterrehberg
 Hohenberg
 Hohenreuth
 Kleinrehmühle
 Kosermühle
 Mannsflur
 Marienweiher
 Marktleugast
 Mittelrehberg
 Neuensorg
 Ösel
 Roth
 Steinbach
 Tannenwirtshaus
 Traindorf
 Vorderrehberg
 Weihermühle
 Zegastmühle

References

Kulmbach (district)